Prunus minutiflora, called the Texas almond, is a shrub native to Texas and northern Mexico.

It is dioecious, having male and female flowers on separate plants, which is rare for Prunus. It mainly grows in limestone soils.

References

External links

Flora of Mexico
Flora of Texas
Plants described in 1850
minutiflora
Dioecious plants
Taxobox binomials not recognized by IUCN